The Toyota Sequoia is a full-size SUV manufactured by Toyota mainly for the North American market since 2000 for the 2001 model year and derived from the Tundra pickup truck. It is the second largest SUV ever produced under the Toyota brand, after the Japan-exclusive, military-focused Mega Cruiser.

Previously manufactured at Toyota Motor Manufacturing Indiana in Princeton, Indiana between 2000 and 2021, and then in Toyota Motor Manufacturing Texas in San Antonio, Texas since 2022, the Sequoia is the first vehicle from a Japanese marque in the popular mainstream full-sized SUV class in North America, and initial planning done by first-generation Sequoia chief engineer Kaoru Hosokawa aimed the Sequoia directly at the Ford Expedition, Chevrolet Tahoe, Nissan Armada, and other full-size SUVs.

Up until the 2021 model year, the Sequoia was slotted between the mid-size 4Runner and the premium Land Cruiser in the North American Toyota SUV lineup. With the discontinuation of North American sales of the Land Cruiser from the 2022 model year onward, the Sequoia became the flagship SUV in Toyota's North America lineup.

, the Sequoia is sold in the United States, Canada, and Costa Rica. It is offered in left-hand drive only.



First generation (XK30/XK40; 2000) 

Development of a full-size SUV alongside a T100 replacement began in the mid-1990s, with a design freeze in 1997 (styled by Toshihiko Shirasawa) and design patent filing of the production design on April 4, 1998 at the Japan Patent Office (JPO) under #1054583. After the introduction of the Toyota Tundra in 1999, speculation started that Toyota intended to compete in the full-size SUV market with a Tundra-based SUV called the Highlander. However, the Highlander name was used on a mid-size Camry-based crossover and the Tundra-based SUV was introduced on January 11, 2000 at the North American International Auto Show as the Toyota Sequoia, with full production starting in September 2000 for the 2001 model year.

The engine, dashboard, sheetmetal, and chassis are shared with the Tundra, with the exception of rear disc brakes and a more sophisticated multi-link live axle rear suspension. The Sequoia was nominated for the North American Truck of the Year award in 2001. When the Sequoia was introduced, it was slightly longer than the contemporary Land Cruiser, larger than the Chevrolet Tahoe in most dimensions and similar in size to the Ford Expedition; its V8 engine was certified as an Ultra Low Emission Vehicle. Frame assemblies and driveshafts are produced by Dana Holding Corporation.

The Sequoia came in two trim levels: SR5 and Limited. It was sold in both two-wheel drive and four-wheel drive versions. Vehicle Stability Control was standard on all models.

Facelift
For the 2005 model year, the Sequoia received a minor facelift. A new engine equipped with VVT-i was new for 2005, as well as a 5-speed automatic transmission, replacing the previous 4-speed. 4 wheel drive models got a Torsen center differential, replacing the previous open differential, that splits power in full-time mode 40% front and 60% rear under normal driving, and can send up to 53% to the front and 71% to the rear during slip. The grill was redesigned, and the orange lamps were removed from the taillights.

Towing Capacity for the 2005 model year:
2WD: 
4WD:

Second generation (XK60; 2007) 

Toyota unveiled the 2008 Sequoia at the November 2007 Los Angeles Auto Show, with sales beginning that following December. Like the original Sequoia, the new model is based on the new Tundra. However major differences with the Tundra include a fully boxed frame, a rear independent suspension featuring double wishbones with coil springs for improved ride comfort and room, and a locking center differential on 4-wheel drive models. Toyota stated the new frame is 70 percent more resistant to bending flex with torsional rigidity up 30 percent. However, the new model weighs  more than the previous Sequoia. The drag coefficient has been reduced to 0.35.

Improvements include an optional ULEV-II compliant 381 horsepower 5.7 L 3UR-FE V8, mated to a 6-speed automatic.

The 2008 Sequoia came in three trim lines: the SR5 and Limited, and new Platinum. The base engine is the previous ULEV compliant 4.7 L 2UZ-FE  V8 featured from the previous generation. The 4.7 L is standard on the SR5. Some of the earlier 2008 and 2009 SR5 models do come with the 5.7 L as an option when purchasing, while the Limited and Platinum models come standard with a 5.7 L V8 engine. Four-wheel drive is available on all models.

The interior of the 2008 Sequoia features the same dash as the new Tundra. Standard features include a tilt and telescopic steering wheel, power windows and doors, dual sun visors, and a keyless entry.  Options include DVD based navigation with backup camera and 7" screen, a rear DVD entertainment system, a 14-speaker JBL audio system, and heated seats with ventilated coolers in the front row and warmers in the second row, available in Platinum trim. The Limited trim includes audio, climate, and hands-free Bluetooth mobile phone system controls, an improved JBL audio system, electroluminescent Optitron gauges, and an electrochromic auto-dimming rear-view mirror and side view mirrors with a HomeLink transceiver. The Platinum model includes a standard DVD navigation with a backup camera, a rear air suspension which can lower for easy loading, and Dynamic Laser Cruise Control.

Seating arrangements are for seven or eight passengers, eight for SR5 and Limited models and seven for Platinum models. Power folding 60/40 split third row seats are available on the Platinum. For complete trailer & weight capacities, see Toyota's website.

Exterior differences include door handle colors (color-keyed for the SR5; chrome for the Limited and Platinum), diamond-cut  aluminum alloy wheels for the Platinum trim, and varying power-heated remote-controlled side mirrors.

Engines

Safety
Standard safety features include Vehicle Stability Control, traction control, anti-lock brakes brake assist, electronic brakeforce distribution, front side torso airbags and roll-sensing side curtain airbags for all three rows.  For the 2010 model knee airbags were added as standard feature for front driver and passenger safety.

Note: The Sequoia has not been retested for 2010–2016.

In 2015, the Insurance Institute for Highway Safety (IIHS) found the Sequoia 4WD to have the lowest overall driver death rate in its class with 0 deaths per million registered vehicle years.

Model year changes
The 2009 model year adds E85 flex fuel capability for the 5.7 L V8 sold in certain states.
For the 2010 model year the 4.7 L V8 is replaced by an all-new 4.6 L 1UR-FE engine paired to a six-speed automatic transmission.  The SR5 and Platinum trims become mono-spec and the Limited grade offers three stand alone options (navigation system, rear-seat entertainment and seven-passenger seating).  Front driver and passenger knee airbags were added as a standard feature. Platinum models get wood trim on the steering wheel and shift gear, and Bluetooth and audio controls are standard on the SR5 trim. The Timberland Mica exterior color gets replaced with the new Camry's Spruce Mica. All audio systems have USB connectivity with iPod integration, and the rear-view mirror on the Limited trim has a built-in rear-view camera.
For the 2012 model year, Toyota's Entune System was added as a standard on SR5, while an upgraded version featuring navigation became an optional feature on Limited and standard on the Platinum trim. Blind Spot Monitoring was optional on the 2012 Platinum model.
For the 2014 model year, a Blu-ray DVD player became an optional feature on Limited and standard in Platinum.
No major changes were made for the 2015, 2016 and 2017 model years.
On February 9, 2017, Toyota unveiled a refreshed Sequoia for the 2018 model year, featuring new standard LED headlights, daytime running lights and foglights, and three new exterior colors: Midnight Black Metallic, Shoreline Blue Pearl and Toasted Walnut Pearl. Each trim level also gets its own specific grille design. It also added a TRD level trim to its returning SR5, Limited, and Platinum trims, an upgraded instrumentation panel, automotive emergency braking and the Toyota Safety Sense feature.
The 2020 model year Sequoia was updated with a new TRD Pro package designed for off-road capabilities, featuring Apple CarPlay, Android Auto, Toyota Safety Sense-P, aluminum-bodied internal bypass Fox shock absorbers, and a more enhanced grille in line with the TRD Pro branding. Toyota Safety Sense-P includes forward collision warning with automatic braking, lane keeping assist, adaptive cruise control, blind-spot monitoring and rear cross-traffic alert.
The 2021 Sequoia received a nightshade edition, putting it in line with the entire Toyota lineup in North America. This feature, which was introduced at the Chicago Auto Show on February 6, 2020, went on sale in the third quarter of 2020, but was limited to at 2,500 units.

Accolades
In a 2008 Motor Trend comparison between several full-size SUVs, the Sequoia took first place.

The Sequoia is the top vehicle in the US that is most likely to last 200,000 miles according to a 2019 study from iSeeCars.

Third generation (XK80; 2022) 

The third-generation Sequoia was unveiled on January 25, 2022 for the 2023 model year. Production began on September 21, 2022, and sales began in October 2022. The production was moved to the San Antonio plant, built alongside the XK70 series Tundra due to the Indiana facility preparing to build two upcoming 8-seat passenger SUVs that will feature hybrid powertrains.

It is built on the body-on-frame GA-F platform. Like the first generation, this generation uses a solid rear axle instead of independent setup from the previous generation.

The third-generation Sequoia is available in five trim levels, four of which are carried over from the previous generation: SR5, Limited, Platinum, and TRD Pro, as well as the flagship Capstone luxury-oriented trim. Depending on trims, the Sequoia is available with either a seven or eight passenger seating, with either a split bench or dual captain's chairs in the second row.

Sales

Recall
The 2008-2010 Sequoias were part of one of the 2009-2010 Toyota recalls that required the installation of a small shim to relieve unwanted friction and restore fluidity to the accelerator pedal.  Early 2003 Sequoias were recalled to reprogram the Vehicle Stability Control system due to the possibility of poor acceleration at certain low speeds. The 2002-2003 Sequoia model years also had a defect in the front ball joints. 2004 Toyota Sequoias were subject to the Takata Airbag recall done for free by Toyota dealerships. Recently, the Sequoia, along with the Tacoma and Tundra, have another recall due to the frame prematurely rusting.  If there is a 10 mm perforation found on the frame, the vehicle frame will be replaced, if the service is done within 12 years of vehicle purchase or 1 year after recall became official.  For those vehicles without 10 mm perforation and located in a cold weather state, Toyota will perform an undercoating service to prevent future rust from forming.

References

External links 

  (US)
  Toyota press release detailing the launch of the 2008 Sequoia at the Los Angeles Auto Show.
  Toyota's official pricing announcement of the 2008 Sequoia.

Sequoia
Cars introduced in 2000
2010s cars
2020s cars
Full-size sport utility vehicles
Rear-wheel-drive vehicles
All-wheel-drive vehicles
Flexible-fuel vehicles
Hybrid electric vehicles
Partial zero-emissions vehicles
Motor vehicles manufactured in the United States